Bělkovice-Lašťany is a municipality and village in Olomouc District in the Olomouc Region of the Czech Republic. It has about 2,300 inhabitants.

Administrative parts
Bělkovice-Lašťany is made up of one administrative part Bělkovice-Lašťany, which is made of local parts of Bělkovice and Lašťany.

Notable people
Josef Bryks (1916–1957), fighter pilot and political prisoner
Alois Kaňkovský (born 1983), cyclist
Martin Pospíšil (born 1991), footballer

References

Villages in Olomouc District